SC-8109 is a steroidal antimineralocorticoid of the spirolactone group which was never marketed. It is a potent antagonist of the mineralocorticoid receptor and is more potent than the related drug SC-5233 (of which SC-8109 is the 19-nor analogue). However, SC-8109 was found to have relatively low oral bioavailability and potency, though it nonetheless produced a mild diuretic effect in patients with congestive heart failure. Spironolactone (SC-9420; Aldactone), another spirolactone, followed and had both good oral bioavailability and potency, and was the first antimineralocorticoid to be marketed.

In addition to its antimineralocorticoid activity, SC-8109 shows potent progestogenic activity, with similar potency relative to that of progesterone. Its analogue, SC-5233, possesses similar but less potent progestogenic activity. In addition, SC-5233 has been assessed and found to possess some antiandrogenic activity, antagonizing the effects of testosterone in animals, and SC-8109 may as well.

See also
 Canrenone

References

Antimineralocorticoids
Diuretics
Lactones
Norpregnanes
Progestogens
Spiro compounds
Spirolactones